Radar Festival is a music festival held annually in Croatia since 2007.

2007 festival
The festival was held in the Siget neighbourhood of Zagreb. The festival was headlined by Kaiser Chiefs, Queens of the Stone Age and Placebo.  The groups Howling Bells, Anavrin and Overflow also performed.

2008 festival
The second edition of the festival was held in Varaždin. Bob Dylan, Manic Street Preachers, Majke, Drago Mlinarec and Vlado Kreslin performed for the festival at Stadion Varteks.

2009 festival
The third edition was held in Varaždin, with Santana, Solomon Burke, Joe Jackson, Eric Burdon and The Animals, Zoran Predin & Lačni Franc, Voodoo Lizards and Bernard Fowler  (as their special guest) performing.

References

External links
Radar Festival official site

Music festivals in Croatia